Carex paeninsulae is a tussock-forming species of perennial sedge in the family Cyperaceae. It is native to parts of Florida.

See also
List of Carex species

References

paeninsulae
Plants described in 2002
Flora of Florida